The Transport Act 1980 was an Act of Parliament in the United Kingdom. It introduced deregulation of coach services in the United Kingdom and allow authorities to deregulate bus services on a trial basis. It was introduced by the Conservative government of Margaret Thatcher. The later Transport Act 1985 imposed bus deregulation of local buses.

External links
Hansard
Revised Statute from The UK Statute Law Database - Transport Act 1980

United Kingdom Acts of Parliament 1980
1980 in transport
Bus transport in the United Kingdom
Transport policy in the United Kingdom
History of transport in the United Kingdom
Transport legislation